Mal-e Mahmud (also Romanized as Māl-e Maḩmūd and Mal Mahmood; also known as Mollā Maḩmūd, Mollā Moḩammad, and Mulla Muhammad) is a village in Rudhaleh Rural District, Rig District, Ganaveh County, Bushehr Province, Iran. At the 2006 census, its population was 508, in 101 families.

References 

Populated places in Ganaveh County